El gato con botas (Puss in Boots, in English) is a 1961 Eastmancolor live-action Mexican fantasy film. Based on Charles Perrault's Puss in Boots, it was scripted, produced and directed by Roberto Rodriguez, and, starring Santanon in the title role, the film was made by Peliculas Rodriguez, S.A. at the Churubusco-Azteca film studios.

Plot
A king is forced to give his daughter to an ogre. However, a fairy gives a peasant boy a pair of boots. The boy puts them on his cat, which becomes human-sized and leads the boy to fight the ogre.

Cast
Santanon as Puss
Amando Gutierrez as The Ogre
Rafael Munoz
Humberto Dupeyron
Rocio Rosales
Antonio Raxell
Luis Manuel Pelayo

Production

For his role as Puss, the star Santanon was covered entirely by a furred cat costume, which in turn was adorned with feathered hat, vest and pants, and a sword.

Distribution

In 1964, entrepreneur K. Gordon Murray acquired American rights to the film, edited it to 70 minutes, dubbed it, and released it nationwide as one in a series of fantasy films intended to be exhibited strictly as matinee films for children.  Murray's advertising for these films came with strict instructions as to showtimes, additional programming, advertising displays, and other matters normally left to the discretion of theater managers.

External links
 

1961 films
Films based on Puss in Boots
Mexican fantasy films
Films about animals
Films about cats
1960s Mexican films